Archaeopteryx lithographica described by Christian Erich Hermann von Meyer 
Death of Heinrich Rudolf Schinz, Frédéric de Lafresnaye and Édouard Ménétries and Prince Albert. Bird names honouring Prince Albert are Prince Albert's curassow, Menura alberti Albert's lyrebird and Prince Albert's riflebird (Ptiloris magnificus alberti)
Birds described in 1861 include many-colored Chaco finch, invisible rail, grey-capped tyrannulet, African river martin, black dwarf hornbill, Sulawesi myna, northern nightingale-wren, grey-tailed piha, fiery-billed aracari, Ross's goose, 
Alexander von Homeyer collects birds in the Mediterranean.
In February The populations of  Mascarene martin on Mauritius and Réunion are badly affected by a cyclone.
John Gould A Monograph of the Trochilidae or Humming Birds with 360 plates Volume 5 Species described in this work include scaly-breasted hummingbird, violet-tailed sylph and bronze-tailed plumeleteer.
Philip Sclater On the American Barbets (Capitoniae) Ibis, 3: 182–190.online
George Robert Gray Remarks on, and descriptions of, new species of birds lately sent by Mr. A. R. Wallace, from Waigiou, Mysol and Gagie Islands. Proceedings of the Zoological Society of London, 1861
Theodor von Heuglin travels to Africa to search for Eduard Vogel and his companions including Werner Munzinger, Gottlob Kinzelbach, and Hermann Steudner.
Ongoing events
John Gould The birds of Australia; Supplement 1851–69. 1 vol. 81 plates; Artists: J. Gould and H. C. Richter; Lithographer: H. C. Richter
John Gould The birds of Asia; 1850-83 7 vols. 530 plates, Artists: J. Gould, H. C. Richter, W. Hart and J. Wolf; Lithographers:H. C. Richter and W. Hart
The Ibis

References

Bird
Birding and ornithology by year